The IMOCA 60 Class yacht Apivia Mutuelle, FRA 79 was designed by Guillaume Verdier and launched in 2019 after being built CDK Technologies based in Lorient, France. The boat initial skipper who is also a Naval Architect Charlie Dalin had significant input as did MerConcept the company headed by François Gabart.

Racing Results

Timeline

2018 Apivia
Construction Begins

2019 Apivia

2020 Apivia

2021 Apivia
The boat got line honours in the 2020-2021 Vendee Globe but was ranked second following redress given to fellow competitors.

2022 Banque Populaire XII
2021-11-29 The team formally announced the purchase of the boat following Apivia completing the 2021 Route du Rhum with the team starting the handover by helping to return the boat to France.

References 

Individual sailing yachts
2010s sailing yachts
Sailboat type designs by Guillaume Verdier
Sailboat types built in France
Vendée Globe boats
IMOCA 60